Trouble and Her Friends is a science fiction novel by American writer Melissa Scott, first published in 1994. It is set in the United States of America sometime in the near future, and tells the story of India Carless, who goes by the name "Trouble" in her life as a criminal hacker, and her ex-lover Cerise. After leaving the underground behind three years earlier, they discover someone impersonating Trouble online, and reunite to travel across the country to confront him. In its extensive use of virtual reality and neural implants, the novel is a solid example of cyberpunk; however, it is unusual for that genre for having, like much of Scott's work, a distinct feminist perspective and main characters who are gay or lesbian.

The novel won the 1995 Lambda Literary Award for Gay & Lesbian Science Fiction and Fantasy. Melissa Scott had previously been nominated in 1993 and 1994 for her novels Dreamships and Burning Bright, and would win again in 1996 for Shadow Man.

References

1994 American novels
1990s LGBT novels
Novels by Melissa Scott
Novels with lesbian themes
Feminist science fiction novels
American science fiction novels
1994 science fiction novels
Cyberpunk novels
LGBT speculative fiction novels
Lambda Literary Award-winning works
American LGBT novels
Tor Books books